The 2022 Galway Senior Hurling Championship  was the 125th staging of the Galway Senior Hurling Championship since its establishment in 1887. St Thomas' won their fifth consecutive title in a row after defeating Loughrea in a replay at Pearse Stadium on 27 November.

Moycullen participated in the senior championship having beaten Killimor in the 2021 Galway Intermediate Hurling Championship.
The competition was sponsored by Brooks for the third of a 3-year partnership that started in 2020.

Tynagh-Abbey/Duniry were relegated, losing the relegation playoff to Ahascragh-Fohenagh and will play in the 2023 Galway Intermediate Hurling Championship.

Killimor won the 2022 Galway Intermediate Hurling Championship and will play Senior B in 2023.

Competition format
Twenty four teams competed. Twelve teams as determined by the 2021 Competition competed in the Senior A Group and twelve teams competed in the Senior B Group. Eight teams from the Senior A Group and four teams from the Senior B Group progressed to the knockout stage.

Group stage

Senior A
Senior A consisted of 12 teams divided into two groups of 6 teams.
 The top two teams in each group progressed directly to the Quarter-Finals
 The 3rd and 4th placed teams qualified for the Preliminary Quarter-Finals
 All 12 of these teams will play in the 2023 Championship

Senior A – Group 1
{| class="wikitable" 
!width=20|
!  style="width:150px; text-align:left;"|Team
!width=20|
!width=20|
!width=20|
!width=20|
!width=50|
!width=50|
!width=20|
!width=20|
|- style="background:#98FB98;"
|1||align=left| St. Thomas'             ||5||4||0||1||10–98||10–92||6||8
|- style="background:#98FB98;"
|2||align=left| Sarsfields      ||5||3||1||1||11–89||4–92||18||7
|- style="background:#ccf;"
|3||align=left| Clarinbridge           ||5||2||2||1||7–108||9–93||9||6
|- style="background:#ccf;"
|4||align=left| Turloughmore  ||5||3||0||2||6–95||1–78||32||6
|-
|5||align=left| Killimordaly           ||5||1||0||4||4–71||8–100||-41||2
|-
|6||align=left| Castlegar                 ||5||0||1||4||3–88||10–97||-24||1
|}

Senior A – Group 2
{| class="wikitable" 
!width=20|
!  style="width:150px; text-align:left;"|Team
!width=20|
!width=20|
!width=20|
!width=20|
!width=40|
!width=50|
!width=20|
!width=20|
|- style="background:#98FB98;"
|1|| style="text-align:left;"| Loughrea              ||5||5||0||0||7–105||4–78||36||10
|- style="background:#98FB98;"
|2|| style="text-align:left;"| Tommy Larkin's  ||5||3||1||1||11–91||2–93||25||7
|- style="background:#ccf;"
|3|| style="text-align:left;"| Cappataggle        ||5||2||2||1||6–98||5–92||9||6
|- style="background:#ccf;"
|4|| style="text-align:left;"| Craughwell          ||5||2||1||2||9–77||6–79||7||5
|-
|5|| style="text-align:left;"| Gort                      ||5||1||0||4||6–94||9–88||-3||2
|-
|6|| style="text-align:left;"| Kilconieron        ||5||0||0||5||1–74||14–109||-74||0
|}

Senior B
Senior B consisted of 12 teams divided into two groups of 6.
 The top team from each group
 qualified for the Preliminary Quarter-Finals
 will play in the 2023 Championship
 The second and third placed teams cross-played with the winners also qualifying for the Preliminary Quarter-Finals

Senior B – Group 1

{| class="wikitable" 
!width=20|
!  style="width:150px; text-align:left;"|Team
!width=20|
!width=20|
!width=20|
!width=20|
!width=50|
!width=50|
!width=20|
!width=20|
|- style="background:#ccf;"
|1|| style="text-align:left;"| Oranmore-Maree            ||5||4||0||1||6–90||3–76||23||8
|- style="background:#FFEFD5;"
|2|| style="text-align:left;"| Moycullen                      ||5||4||0||1||9–95||9–84||11||8
|- style="background:#FFEFD5;"
|3|| style="text-align:left;"| Athenry                          ||5||3||0||2||3–90||5–84||0||6
|-
|4|| style="text-align:left;"| Kilnadeema-Leitrim    ||5||3||0||2||10–115||9–94||24||6
|-
|5|| style="text-align:left;"| Beagh                              ||5||1||0||4||5–83||7–101||-24||2
|- style="background:#FFBBBB;"
|6|| style="text-align:left;"| Tynagh-Abbey/Duniry  ||5||0||0||5||5–80||1–84||-34||0
|}

Senior B – Group 2

{| class="wikitable" 
!width=20|
!  style="width:150px; text-align:left;"|Team
!width=20|
!width=20|
!width=20|
!width=20|
!width=40|
!width=45|
!width=20|
!width=20|
|- style="background:#ccf;"
|1||align=left| Portumna                      ||5||5||0||0||6–103||6–74||29||10
|- style="background:#FFEFD5;"
|2||align=left| Ardrahan                      ||5||4||0||1||7–85||5–80||11||8
|- style="background:#FFEFD5;"
|3||align=left| Liam Mellows              ||5||3||0||2||7–94||5–85||15||6
|-
|4||align=left| Pádraig Pearse's      ||5||1||0||4||3–77||5–81||-10||2
|-
|5||align=left| Mullagh                        ||5||1||0||4||7–77||7–95||-18||2
|- style="background:#FFBBBB;"
|6||align=left| Ahascragh-Fohenagh  ||5||1||0||4||3–78||5–99||-35||2
|}

Senior B – Playoff

Senior Relegation Playoff

Preliminary Quarter-finals

Quarter-finals

Semi-finals

Final

Replay

References

Galway Senior Hurling Championship
Galway Senior Hurling Championship
Galway Senior Hurling Championship